Ralph C. Carter (June 25, 1932 – September 4, 2007) was an American politician. He served as a Democratic member of the Florida House of Representatives.

Life and career 
Carter was born in Geneva, Alabama, the son of Annie Elizabeth Cronin and Ralph Clarence Carter. He attended Chipley High School.

In 1961, Carter was elected to the Florida House of Representatives, serving until 1966.

Carter died in September 2007, at the age of 75.

References 

1932 births
2007 deaths
Democratic Party members of the Florida House of Representatives
20th-century American politicians

People from Chipley, Florida
People from Geneva County, Alabama